Thomas Broderick, SMA (1882 - 1933) was an Irish born priest, a member of the Society of African Missions, who served as Vicars Apostolic of Western Nigeria.

Broderick was born in Kilflynn in North Kerry. He was educated at the SMA St. Joseph's College, Wilton, Cork, before completing his clerical training in Lyon, France.

In 1906. shortly after ordination, Broderick left for the Gold Coast (Ghana). In 1908 he returned to Ireland as director of the new Sacred Heart College, Ballinafad, a juniorate (a preparatory secondary school),  With the setting up of the Irish SMA seminary in Blackrock, Co. Cork, Broderick was appointed its first Rector. 

Broderick was ordained Titular Bishop of Petnelissus and Vicar Apostolic of Western Nigeria in 1917, in St. Brendans Cathedral in his native Kerry. officiating over the Benin/Asaba diocese he lived in Asaba.

Broderick died following an operation in Genoa, in 1933.

References

1882 births
1933 deaths
20th-century Roman Catholic bishops in Nigeria
Clergy from County Kerry
Irish expatriate Catholic bishops
Roman Catholic bishops of Benin City
Society of African Missions